Mansfield Park is a 2007 British television film directed by Iain B. MacDonald and starring Billie Piper, Michelle Ryan, and Blake Ritson. Adapted from Jane Austen's classic 1814 novel of the same name, the film is about Fanny Price, who is sent by her poor mother to live with wealthy relatives at their Mansfield estate. By the age of eighteen, Fanny is in love with her sensitive cousin who is studying to be a clergyman. Her feelings for him and her moral sense prevent her from accepting a marriage proposal from a much wealthier suitor.

Mansfield Park premiered on 18 March 2007 on the United Kingdom network ITV at 9:00 p.m., as part of The Jane Austen Season. It was filmed at Newby Hall, North Yorkshire, England. It made its TV debut in Canada on 23 December 2007 and in the United States on 27 January 2008. The drama ran for two hours (including advertisement breaks) in the United Kingdom, 90 minutes without the breaks.

Cast

Reception 
Writing for The Guardian, Kathryn Flett wrote of the adaptation "if you didn't mind your Austen both mucked about with and a little bit mucky—then it was all good fun, though I think Billie [Piper] may have avoided delving too deeply into the source material in favour of renting the 1996 adaptation of Emma, so uncannily like Gwyneth doing British did she sound."

Paula Byrne, in analysing the way the film industry deals with the works of Jane Austen, says "it remains to be seen whether it is possible for there to be a faithful dramatisation of Mansfield Park". In Fanny Price, Austen dared to portray a diffident, anxious heroine who nevertheless displays an iron will. Byrne argues that "In this regard, Fanny Price is the most interesting of Austen’s heroines and the one whom the conventions of modern cinema and television are least well qualified to serve". She concludes that the 2007 ITV adaptation of Mansfield Park failed "because even as fine an actor as Billie Piper failed to capture the simultaneous strength and weakness of Fanny Price".

References

External links 

 Mansfield Park at pbs.org.
 

ITV television dramas
Television series set in the 19th century
Television shows based on works by Jane Austen
Television series by All3Media
British television films
2007 television films
2007 films
Films based on works by Jane Austen
Mansfield Park